The Whitefish River is a  river in the Deline District, Sahtu Region, Northwest Territories, Canada.

Course
The river begins at an unnamed lake and flows west then southwest to the west side Man Drowned Himself Lake. It exits the lake at the south, takes in the unnamed left tributary arriving from Kekwinatui Lake, and heads southwest, west and northwest. Great Bear Lake empties via the Great Bear River and the Mackenzie River into the Arctic Ocean.

Hydrology
A hydrometric station operated near the mouth of the Whitefish River between 1977 and 1992. The hydrometric station was re-established in July 2017.

See also
List of rivers of the Northwest Territories

References

Rivers of the Northwest Territories
Sahtu Region